DLA0817g, also known as the Wolfe Disk, is a galaxy located in the constellation Cancer,  from Earth.

Discovered in 2017 using observations made with the Atacama Large Millimeter Array (ALMA), it was studied with the Karl G. Jansky Very Large Array (JVLA) observatory and the Hubble Space Telescope.

It is a large rotating disc galaxy, with a mass of approximately 72 billion solar masses, dating back to an early age in the life of the universe, approximately 1.5 billion years after the Big Bang. This contradicts previous models that describe the formation and evolution of galaxies and that foresee a gradual and progressive increase in galactic dimensions.

This galaxy has other characteristics that appear early compared to its age. It is nicknamed the Wolfe Galaxy or the Wolfe Disc in honor of Arthur M. Wolfe, an American astrophysicist, one of the discoverers of the Sachs-Wolfe effect.

References 

Cancer (constellation) 
Galaxies
Galaxies discovered in 2017